Casimir Lefaucheux (26 January 1802 – 9 August 1852) was a French gunsmith. He was born in Bonnétable and died in Paris.

Casimir Lefaucheux obtained his first patent in 1827. In 1832, he completed a drop-barrel sporting gun with paper-cased cartridges.

Lefaucheux is credited with the development of one of the first efficient self-contained cartridge systems. This 1836 invention, featuring a pinfire mechanism, followed the pioneering work of Jean Samuel Pauly in 1808-1812. The Lefaucheux cartridge had a conical bullet, a cardboard powder tube, and a copper base that incorporated a primer pellet. Lefaucheux thus proposed one of the first practical breech-loading weapons.

In 1846 Benjamin Houllier improved on the Lefaucheux system by introducing an entirely metallic cartridge of copper brass.

In 1858 the Lefaucheux pistolet-revolver became the first metallic-cartridge revolver to be adopted by a national government, becoming the standard sidearm of the French Navy.

In May 1866 Federinard Cohen-Blind attempted to assassinate Otto Von Bismarck with a [Pepper-box]] in Lefaucheux pistol

A 7 mm Lefaucheux revolver, used by Paul Verlaine to shoot and wound Arthur Rimbaud in 1873, sold for €435,000 at a 2016 Paris auction.

It is thought likely that the gun with which the Dutch painter Vincent van Gogh fatally shot himself in a field in 1890 was a 7 mm Lefaucheux pinfire revolver. The pistol was found, extremely corroded, in 1960 and is on display at the Van Gogh Museum in Amsterdam.

Gallery

Notes

References
 Henrotin, Gerard Lefaucheux 7mm pinfire revolver explained, HLebooks.com, 2013
 Henrotin, Gerard European percussion & pinfire shotguns explained, HLebooks.com, 2011

 
Gunsmiths
1802 births
1852 deaths
Burials at Montmartre Cemetery